Travis Ivey (born December 22, 1986) is a former American football nose tackle. He was signed by the Miami Dolphins of the National Football League as an undrafted free agent in 2010. He played college football at Maryland.

College career

Maryland (2006-2009)
Ivey redshirted his freshman year and played a reserve role as a sophomore and the beginning of his junior year. Ivey started the final four games of his junior year and all 12 games of his senior year.

Professional career

Miami Dolphins
After going undrafted in the 2010 NFL Draft, Ivey signed with the Miami Dolphins. He was waived on August 23.

Cleveland Browns
Ivey signed with the Cleveland Browns on August 25, 2010.

Oakland Raiders
He signed with the Oakland Raiders during the 2011 season and was placed on their practice squad. He was cut several days into the team's 2012 training camp after failing to finish a conditioning run.

References

External links
University of Maryland bio

1986 births
Living people
American football defensive tackles
American football defensive ends
Miami Dolphins players
Cleveland Browns players
Maryland Terrapins football players